Orania rosadoi is a species of sea snail, a marine gastropod mollusk in the family Muricidae, the murex snails or rock snails.

Description

Distribution
This marine species occurs off Mozambique.

References

 Houart, R., 1998. Description of eight new species of Muricidae (Gastropoda). Apex 13(3): 95-109
 Houart, R.; Kilburn, R. N. & Marais, A. P. (2010). Muricidae. pp. 176-270, in: Marais A.P. & Seccombe A.D. (eds), Identification guide to the seashells of South Africa. Volume 1. Groenkloof: Centre for Molluscan Studies. 376 pp.

Gastropods described in 1998
Orania (gastropod)